The 2018–19 Gozo First Division (known as the BOV GFL First Division for sponsorship reasons) was the 72nd season of the Gozo Football League First Division, the highest division in Gozitan football. The season began on 14 September 2018. Victoria Hotspurs were able to defend the title won the previous season, winning their thirteenth title in their history.

Format 

The season is composed of a round-robin system where each team plays each other three times, totalling 21 games. The seventh-placed team will play a relegation play-off with the second-placed team in the Second Division. Most of the matches are scheduled to be played at the Gozo Stadium, with Sannat Ground and Kerċem Ajax Stadium being used as well.

Teams 

Eight teams compete in the league – the top six teams from the previous season, the winner of the relegation play-off between the seventh-placed team and the second-placed team in the Second Division, and a promoted team from the Second Division. Second Division winner Munxar Falcons replaced Oratory Youths.

League table

Results

Matches 1–14 

Teams play each other twice, once assigned as home and once away.

Matches 15–22 

Teams play every other team once (either assigned at home or away).

Relegation play-off 

A play-off match took place between the seventh-placed team from the First Division, Għarb Rangers, and the second-placed team from the Second Division, Sannat Lions, for a place in the 2019–20 GFL First Division.

Season statistics

Top goalscorers

Awards

Monthly awards

References 

Gozo First Division seasons
Gozo
5